Stainless steel is an alloy of iron that is resistant to rusting and corrosion. It contains at least 11% chromium and may contain  elements such as carbon, other nonmetals and metals  to obtain other desired properties. Stainless steel's resistance to corrosion results from the chromium, which forms a passive film that can protect the material and self-heal in the presence of oxygen.

The alloy's properties, such as luster and resistance to corrosion, are useful in many applications. Stainless steel can be rolled into sheets, plates, bars, wire, and tubing. These can be used in cookware, cutlery, surgical instruments, major appliances, vehicles, construction material in large buildings, industrial equipment (e.g., in paper mills, chemical plants, water treatment), and storage tanks and tankers for chemicals and food products.

The biological cleanability of stainless steel is superior to both aluminium and copper, and comparable to glass. Its cleanability, strength, and corrosion resistance have prompted the use of stainless steel in pharmaceutical and food processing plants.

Different types of stainless steel are labeled with an AISI three-digit number. The ISO 15510 standard lists the chemical compositions of stainless steels of the specifications in existing ISO, ASTM, EN, JIS, and GB standards in a useful interchange table.

Properties

Conductivity 

Like steel, stainless steels are relatively poor conductors of electricity, with significantly lower electrical conductivities than copper. In particular, the electrical contact resistance (ECR) of stainless steel arises as a result of the dense protective oxide layer and limits its functionality in applications as electrical connectors. Copper alloys and nickel-coated connectors tend to exhibit lower ECR values, and are preferred materials for such applications. Nevertheless, stainless steel connectors are employed in situations where  ECR poses a lower design criteria and corrosion resistance is required, for example in high temperatures and oxidizing environments.

Melting point 

As with most alloys, the melting point of stainless steel is expressed in the form of a range of temperatures, and not a singular temperature. This temperature range goes from  depending on the specific consistency of the alloy in question.

Hardness 
Stainless steel is a highly durable metal known for its impressive hardness. This quality is primarily due to the presence of two key components: chromium and nickel. Chromium forms an oxide layer on the metal's surface, protecting it from corrosion and wear. Meanwhile, nickel contributes to the metal's strength and ductility, enhancing its overall hardness. Stainless steel can also be hardened through heat treatment processes such as annealing or quenching, further improving its hardness.

Thermal Conduction 
The thermal conductivity of stainless steel depends on its composition and structure. Typically, stainless steel has a thermal conductivity ranging from 15 to 20 W/mK (watts per meter Kelvin). Due to this, it keeps more energy that stabilizes the surrounding temperature.

Magnetism 

Martensitic, duplex and ferritic stainless steels are magnetic, while austenitic stainless steel is usually non-magnetic. Ferritic steel owes its magnetism to its body-centered cubic crystal structure, in which iron atoms are arranged in cubes (with one iron atom at each corner) and an additional iron atom in the center. This central iron atom is responsible for ferritic steel's magnetic properties. This arrangement also limits the amount of carbon the steel can absorb to around 0.025%. Grades with low coercive field have been developed for electro-valves used in household appliances and for injection systems in internal combustion engines. Some applications require non-magnetic materials, such as magnetic resonance imaging. Austenitic stainless steels, which are usually non-magnetic, can be made slightly magnetic through work hardening. Sometimes, if austenitic steel is bent or cut, magnetism occurs along the edge of the stainless steel because the crystal structure rearranges itself.

Corrosion 

The addition of nitrogen also improves resistance to pitting corrosion and increases mechanical strength. Thus, there are numerous grades of stainless steel with varying chromium and molybdenum contents to suit the environment the alloy must endure. Corrosion resistance can be increased further by the following means:
 increasing chromium content to more than 11%
 adding nickel to at least 8% 
 adding molybdenum (which also improves resistance to pitting corrosion)

Wear 

Galling, sometimes called cold welding, is a form of severe adhesive wear, which can occur when two metal surfaces are in relative motion to each other and under heavy pressure. Austenitic stainless steel fasteners are particularly susceptible to thread galling, though other alloys that self-generate a protective oxide surface film, such as aluminium and titanium, are also susceptible. Under high contact-force sliding, this oxide can be deformed, broken, and removed from parts of the component, exposing the bare reactive metal. When the two surfaces are of the same material, these exposed surfaces can easily fuse. Separation of the two surfaces can result in surface tearing and even complete seizure of metal components or fasteners. Galling can be mitigated by the use of dissimilar materials (bronze against stainless steel) or using different stainless steels (martensitic against austenitic). Additionally, threaded joints may be lubricated to provide a film between the two parts and prevent galling. Nitronic 60, made by selective alloying with manganese, silicon, and nitrogen, has demonstrated a reduced tendency to gall.

Density 
The density of stainless steel can be somewhere between 7,500kg/m3 to 8,000kg/m3 depending on the alloy.

History 

The invention of stainless steel followed a series of scientific developments, starting in 1798 when chromium was first shown to the French Academy by Louis Vauquelin. In the early 1800s, British scientists James Stoddart, Michael Faraday, and Robert Mallet observed the resistance of chromium-iron alloys ("chromium steels") to oxidizing agents. Robert Bunsen discovered chromium's resistance to strong acids. The corrosion resistance of iron-chromium alloys may have been first recognized in 1821 by Pierre Berthier, who noted their resistance against attack by some acids and suggested their use in cutlery.

In the 1840s, both of Britain's Sheffield steelmakers and then Krupp of Germany were producing chromium steel with the latter employing it for cannons in the 1850s. In 1861, Robert Forester Mushet took out a patent on chromium steel in Britain.

These events led to the first American production of chromium-containing steel by J. Baur of the Chrome Steel Works of Brooklyn for the construction of bridges. A US patent for the product was issued in 1869. This was followed with recognition of the corrosion resistance of chromium alloys by Englishmen John T. Woods and John Clark, who noted ranges of chromium from 5–30%, with added tungsten and "medium carbon". They pursued the commercial value of the innovation via a British patent for "Weather-Resistant Alloys".

In the late 1890s, German chemist Hans Goldschmidt developed an aluminothermic (thermite) process for producing carbon-free chromium. Between 1904 and 1911, several researchers, particularly Leon Guillet of France, prepared alloys that would be considered stainless steel today.

In 1908, the Essen firm Friedrich Krupp Germaniawerft built the 366-ton sailing yacht Germania featuring a chrome-nickel steel hull, in Germany. In 1911, Philip Monnartz reported on the relationship between chromium content and corrosion resistance. On 17 October 1912, Krupp engineers Benno Strauss and Eduard Maurer patented  as Nirosta the austenitic stainless steel known today as 18/8 or AISI type 304.

Similar developments were taking place in the United States, where Christian Dantsizen of General Electric and Frederick Becket (1875-1942) at Union Carbide were industrializing ferritic stainless steel. In 1912, Elwood Haynes applied for a US patent on a martensitic stainless steel alloy, which was not granted until 1919.

Harry Brearley

While seeking a corrosion-resistant alloy for gun barrels in 1912, Harry Brearley of the Brown-Firth research laboratory in Sheffield, England, discovered and subsequently industrialized a martensitic stainless steel alloy, today known as AISI type 420. The discovery was announced two years later in a January 1915 newspaper article in The New York Times.

The metal was later marketed under the "Staybrite" brand by Firth Vickers in England and was used for the new entrance canopy for the Savoy Hotel in London in 1929. Brearley applied for a US patent during 1915 only to find that Haynes had already registered one. Brearley and Haynes pooled their funding and, with a group of investors, formed the American Stainless Steel Corporation, with headquarters in Pittsburgh, Pennsylvania.

Rustless steel
Brearley initially called his new alloy "rustless steel".  The alloy was sold in the US under different brand names like "Allegheny metal" and "Nirosta steel". Even within the metallurgy industry, the name remained unsettled; in 1921, one trade journal called it "unstainable steel".  Brearley  worked with a local cutlery manufacturer, who gave it the name "stainless steel".  As late as 1932, Ford Motor Company continued calling the alloy rustless steel in automobile promotional materials.

In 1929, before the Great Depression, over 25,000 tons of stainless steel were manufactured and sold in the US annually.

Major technological advances in the 1950s and 1960s allowed the production of large tonnages at an affordable cost:
 AOD process (argon oxygen decarburization), for the removal of carbon and sulfur
Continuous casting and hot strip rolling
 The Z-Mill, or Sendzimir cold rolling mill
 The Creusot-Loire Uddeholm (CLU) and related processes which use steam instead of some or all of the argon

Types 

Stainless steel is classified into five main families that are primarily differentiated by their crystalline structure:
austenitic
ferritic
martensitic
duplex
precipitation hardening

Austenitic 

Austenitic stainless steel is the largest family of stainless steels, making up about two-thirds of all stainless steel production. They possess an austenitic microstructure, which is a face-centered cubic crystal structure. This microstructure is achieved by alloying steel with sufficient nickel and/or manganese and nitrogen to maintain an austenitic microstructure at all temperatures, ranging from the cryogenic region to the melting point. Thus, austenitic stainless steels are not hardenable by heat treatment since they possess the same microstructure at all temperatures.

Austenitic stainless steels sub-groups, 200 series and 300 series:

 200 series are chromium-manganese-nickel alloys that maximize the use of manganese and nitrogen to minimize the use of nickel. Due to their nitrogen addition, they possess approximately 50% higher yield strength than 300 series stainless sheets of steel. 
 Type 201 is hardenable through cold working.
 Type 202 is a general-purpose stainless steel.  Decreasing nickel content and increasing manganese results in weak corrosion resistance.
 300 series are chromium-nickel alloys that achieve their austenitic microstructure almost exclusively by nickel alloying; some very highly alloyed grades include some nitrogen to reduce nickel requirements. 300 series is the largest group and the most widely used. 
 Type 304: The best-known grade is type 304, also known as 18/8 and 18/10 for its composition of 18% chromium and 8% or 10% nickel, respectively.
 Type 316: The second most common austenitic stainless steel is type 316. The addition of 2% molybdenum provides greater resistance to acids and localized corrosion caused by chloride ions. Low-carbon versions, such as 316L or 304L, have carbon contents below 0.03% and are used to avoid corrosion problems caused by welding.

Ferritic 

Ferritic stainless steels possess a ferrite microstructure like carbon steel, which is a body-centered cubic crystal structure, and contain between 10.5% and 27% chromium with very little or no nickel. This microstructure is present at all temperatures due to the chromium addition, so they are not hardenable by heat treatment. They cannot be strengthened by cold work to the same degree as austenitic stainless steels. They are magnetic. Additions of niobium (Nb), titanium (Ti), and zirconium (Zr) to type 430 allow good weldability. Due to the near-absence of nickel, they are less expensive than austenitic steels and are present in many products, which include:

 Automobile exhaust pipes (type 409 and 409 Cb are used in North America; stabilized grades type 439 and 441 are used in Europe)
Architectural and structural applications (type 430, which contains 17% Cr)
Building components, such as slate hooks, roofing, and chimney ducts

Martensitic 

Martensitic stainless steels have a body-centered cubic crystal structure, and offer a wide range of properties and are used as stainless engineering steels, stainless tool steels, and creep-resistant steels. They are magnetic, and not as corrosion-resistant as ferritic and austenitic stainless steels due to their low chromium content. They fall into four categories (with some overlap):

 Fe-Cr-C grades. These were the first grades used and are still widely used in engineering and wear-resistant applications.
 Fe-Cr-Ni-C grades. Some carbon is replaced by nickel. They offer higher toughness and higher corrosion resistance. Grade EN 1.4303 (Casting grade CA6NM) with 13% Cr and 4% Ni is used for most Pelton, Kaplan, and Francis turbines in hydroelectric power plants because it has good casting properties, good weldability and good resistance to cavitation erosion.
 Precipitation hardening grades. Grade EN 1.4542 (also known as 17-4 PH), the best-known grade, combines martensitic hardening and precipitation hardening.  It achieves high strength and good toughness and is used in aerospace among other applications.
 Creep-resisting grades.

Martensitic stainless steels can be heat treated to provide better mechanical properties. The heat treatment typically involves three steps:

 Austenitizing, in which the steel is heated to a temperature in the range , depending on grade. The resulting austenite has a face-centered cubic crystal structure.
 Quenching. The austenite is transformed into martensite, a hard body-centered tetragonal crystal structure. The quenched martensite is very hard and too brittle for most applications. Some residual austenite may remain.
 Tempering. Higher tempering temperatures decrease yield strength and ultimate tensile strength but increase the elongation and impact resistance.

Replacing some carbon in martensitic stainless steels by nitrogen is a recent development. The limited solubility of nitrogen is increased by the pressure electroslag refining (PESR) process, in which melting is carried out under high nitrogen pressure. Steel containing up to 0.4% nitrogen has been achieved, leading to higher hardness and strength and higher corrosion resistance. As PESR is expensive, lower but significant nitrogen contents have been achieved using the standard AOD process.

Duplex 

Duplex stainless steels have a mixed microstructure of austenite and ferrite, the ideal ratio being a 50:50 mix, though commercial alloys may have ratios of 40:60. They are characterized by higher chromium (19–32%) and molybdenum (up to 5%) and lower nickel contents than austenitic stainless steels. Duplex stainless steels have roughly twice the yield strength of austenitic stainless steel. Their mixed microstructure provides improved resistance to chloride stress corrosion cracking in comparison to austenitic stainless steel types 304 and 316. Duplex grades are usually divided into three sub-groups based on their corrosion resistance: lean duplex, standard duplex, and super duplex. The properties of duplex stainless steels are achieved with an overall lower alloy content than similar-performing super-austenitic grades, making their use cost-effective for many applications. The pulp and paper industry was one of the first to extensively use duplex stainless steel. Today, the oil and gas industry is the largest user and has pushed for more corrosion resistant grades, leading to the development of super duplex and hyper duplex grades. More recently, the less expensive (and slightly less corrosion-resistant) lean duplex has been developed, chiefly for structural applications in building and construction (concrete reinforcing bars, plates for bridges, coastal works) and in the water industry.

Precipitation hardening 
Precipitation hardening stainless steels have corrosion resistance comparable to austenitic varieties, but can be precipitation hardened to even higher strengths than other martensitic grades. There are three types of precipitation hardening stainless steels:

 Martensitic 17-4 PH (AISI 630  EN 1.4542) contains about 17% Cr, 4% Ni, 4% Cu, and 0.3% Nb.

Solution treatment at about  followed by quenching results in a relatively ductile martensitic structure. Subsequent aging treatment at  precipitates Nb and Cu-rich phases that increase the strength up to above 1000 MPa yield strength. This outstanding strength level is used in high-tech applications such as aerospace (usually after remelting to eliminate non-metallic inclusions, which increases fatigue life). Another major advantage of this steel is that aging, unlike tempering treatments, is carried out at a temperature that can be applied to (nearly) finished parts without distortion and discoloration.

 Semi-austenitic 17-7 PH (AISI 631 EN 1.4568) contains about 17% Cr, 7.2% Ni, and 1.2% Al.

Typical heat treatment involves solution treatment and quenching. At this point, the structure remains austenitic. Aging at  — which precipitates the Ni3Al intermetallic phase—is carried out as above on nearly finished parts. Yield stress levels above 1400MPa are then reached.

 Austenitic A286(ASTM 660 EN 1.4980) contains about Cr 15%, Ni 25%, Ti 2.1%, Mo 1.2%, V 1.3%, and B 0.005%.

The structure remains austenitic at all temperatures.

As a result, A286 is classified as an Fe-based superalloy, used in jet engines, gas turbines, and turbo parts.

Grades 

Stainless steel has over 150 grades recognized, of which 15 are most commonly used. Many systems are used for grading stainless and other steels, including US SAE steel grades. The Unified Numbering System for Metals and Alloys (UNS) was developed by the ASTM in 1970. The Europeans have developed EN 10088 for the same purpose.

Terminology 
In its early history, stainless steel was sometimes called rustless steel. Both adjectives, stainless and rustless, are duly recognized and accepted as exaggerations: stainless steel is not literally incapable of rusting, but its established name is "stainless steel" nonetheless.

In technical datasets, stainless steel is sometimes designated as inox (inoxidizable), CRES (corrosion-resistant), or SS or SST (stainless steel).

Stainless steel can also be designated by subclass or grade without further specification, as for example 18–8, 17-4 PH, 316, 303, or 304.

Corrosion resistance

Unlike carbon steel, stainless steels do not suffer uniform corrosion when exposed to wet environments. Unprotected carbon steel rusts readily when exposed to a combination of air and moisture. The resulting iron oxide surface layer is porous and fragile. In addition, as iron oxide occupies a larger volume than the original steel, this layer expands and tends to flake and fall away, exposing the underlying steel to further attack. In comparison, stainless steels contain sufficient chromium to undergo passivation, spontaneously forming a microscopically thin inert surface film of chromium oxide by reaction with the oxygen in the air and even the small amount of dissolved oxygen in the water. This passive film prevents further corrosion by blocking oxygen diffusion to the steel surface and thus prevents corrosion from spreading into the bulk of the metal.[3] This film is self-repairing, even when scratched or temporarily disturbed by an upset condition in the environment that exceeds the inherent corrosion resistance of that grade.

The resistance of this film to corrosion depends upon the chemical composition of the stainless steel, chiefly the chromium content. It is customary to distinguish between four forms of corrosion: uniform, localized (pitting), galvanic, and SCC (stress corrosion cracking). Any of these forms of corrosion can occur when the grade of stainless steel is not suited for the working environment.

The designation "CRES" refers to corrosion-resistant steel.

Uniform 

Uniform corrosion takes place in very aggressive environments, typically where chemicals are produced or heavily used, such as in the pulp and paper industries. The entire surface of the steel is attacked, and the corrosion is expressed as corrosion rate in mm/year (usually less than 0.1 mm/year is acceptable for such cases). Corrosion tables provide guidelines.

This is typically the case when stainless steels are exposed to acidic or basic solutions. Whether stainless steel corrodes depends on the kind and concentration of acid or base and the solution temperature. Uniform corrosion is typically easy to avoid because of extensive published corrosion data or easily performed laboratory corrosion testing.

Acidic solutions can be put into two general categories: reducing acids, such as hydrochloric acid and dilute sulfuric acid, and oxidizing acids, such as nitric acid and concentrated sulfuric acid. Increasing chromium and molybdenum content provides increased resistance to reducing acids while increasing chromium and silicon content provides increased resistance to oxidizing acids. Sulfuric acid is one of the most-produced industrial chemicals. Thus type 304 SS is rarely used in contact with sulfuric acid. type 904L and Alloy 20 are resistant to sulfuric acid at even higher concentrations above room temperature. Concentrated sulfuric acid possesses oxidizing characteristics like nitric acid, and thus silicon-bearing stainless steels are also useful. Hydrochloric acid damages any kind of stainless steel and should be avoided. All types of stainless steel resist attack from phosphoric acid and nitric acid at room temperature. At high concentrations and elevated temperatures, attack will occur, and higher-alloy stainless steels are required. In general, organic acids are less corrosive than mineral acids such as hydrochloric and sulfuric acid. As the molecular weight of organic acids increases, their corrosivity decreases. Formic acid has the lowest molecular weight and is a weak acid. Type 304 can be used with formic acid, though it tends to discolor the solution. Type 316 is commonly used for storing and handling acetic acid, a commercially important organic acid.

Type 304 and type 316 stainless steels are unaffected by weak bases such as ammonium hydroxide, even in high concentrations and at high temperatures. The same grades exposed to stronger bases such as sodium hydroxide at high concentrations and high temperatures will likely experience some etching and cracking. Increasing chromium and nickel contents provide increased resistance.

All grades resist damage from aldehydes and amines, though in the latter case type 316 is preferable to type 304; cellulose acetate damages type 304 unless the temperature is kept low. Fats and fatty acids only affect type 304 at temperatures above  and type 316 SS above , while type 317 SS is unaffected at all temperatures. Type 316L is required for the processing of urea.

Localized 

Localized corrosion can occur in several ways, e.g. pitting corrosion and crevice corrosion. These localized attacks are most common in the presence of chloride ions. Higher chloride levels require more highly alloyed stainless steels.

Localized corrosion can be difficult to predict because it is dependent on many factors, including:
 Chloride ion concentration. Even when chloride solution concentration is known, it is still possible for localized corrosion to occur unexpectedly. Chloride ions can become unevenly concentrated in certain areas, such as in crevices (e.g. under gaskets) or on surfaces in vapor spaces due to evaporation and condensation.
 Temperature: increasing temperature increases susceptibility.
 Acidity: increasing acidity increases susceptibility.
 Stagnation: stagnant conditions increase susceptibility.
 Oxidizing species: the presence of oxidizing species, such as ferric and cupric ions, increases susceptibility.

Pitting corrosion is considered the most common form of localized corrosion. The corrosion resistance of stainless steels to pitting corrosion is often expressed by the PREN, obtained through the formula:

,

where the terms correspond to the proportion of the contents by mass of chromium, molybdenum, and nitrogen in the steel. For example, if the steel consisted of 15% chromium %Cr would be equal to 15.

The higher the PREN, the higher the pitting corrosion resistance. Thus, increasing chromium, molybdenum, and nitrogen contents provide better resistance to pitting corrosion.

Though the PREN of certain steel may be theoretically sufficient to resist pitting corrosion, crevice corrosion can still occur when the poor design has created confined areas (overlapping plates, washer-plate interfaces, etc.) or when deposits form on the material. In these select areas, the PREN may not be high enough for the service conditions. Good design, fabrication techniques, alloy selection, proper operating conditions based on the concentration of active compounds present in the solution causing corrosion, pH, etc. can prevent such corrosion.

Stress 
Stress corrosion cracking (SCC) is a sudden cracking and failure of a component without deformation. It may occur when three conditions are met:

 The part is stressed (by an applied load or by residual stress).
 The environment is aggressive (high chloride level, temperature above , presence of H2S).
 The stainless steel is not sufficiently SCC-resistant.

The SCC mechanism results from the following sequence of events:

 Pitting occurs.
 Cracks start from a pit initiation site.
 Cracks then propagate through the metal in a transgranular or intergranular mode.
 Failure occurs.

Whereas pitting usually leads to unsightly surfaces and, at worst, to perforation of the stainless sheet, failure by SCC can have severe consequences. It is therefore considered as a special form of corrosion.

As SCC requires several conditions to be met, it can be counteracted with relatively easy measures, including:

 Reducing the stress level (the oil and gas specifications provide requirements for maximal stress level in H2S-containing environments).
 Assessing the aggressiveness of the environment (high chloride content, temperature above , etc.).
 Selecting the right type of stainless steel: super austenitic such as grade 904L or super-duplex (ferritic stainless steels and duplex stainless steels are very resistant to SCC).

Galvanic 

Galvanic corrosion (also called "dissimilar-metal corrosion") refers to corrosion damage induced when two dissimilar materials are coupled in a corrosive electrolyte. The most common electrolyte is water, ranging from freshwater to seawater. When a galvanic couple forms, one of the metals in the couple becomes the anode and corrodes faster than it would alone, while the other becomes the cathode and corrodes slower than it would alone. Stainless steel, due to having a more positive electrode potential than for example carbon steel and aluminium, becomes the cathode, accelerating the corrosion of the anodic metal. An example is the corrosion of aluminium rivets fastening stainless steel sheets in contact with water. The relative surface areas of the anode and the cathode are important in determining the rate of corrosion. In the above example, the surface area of the rivets is small compared to that of the stainless steel sheet, resulting in rapid corrosion. However, if stainless steel fasteners are used to assemble aluminium sheets, galvanic corrosion will be much slower because the galvanic current density on the aluminium surface will be many orders of magnitude smaller. A frequent mistake is to assemble stainless steel plates with carbon steel fasteners; whereas using stainless steel to fasten carbon-steel plates is usually acceptable, the reverse is not. Providing electrical insulation between the dissimilar metals, where possible, is effective at preventing this type of corrosion.

High-temperature 

At elevated temperatures, all metals react with hot gases. The most common high-temperature gaseous mixture is air, of which oxygen is the most reactive component. Oxidation resistance in stainless steels increases with additions of chromium, silicon, and aluminium. Small additions of cerium and yttrium increase the adhesion of the oxide layer on the surface. The addition of chromium remains the most common method to increase high-temperature corrosion resistance in stainless steels; chromium reacts with oxygen to form a chromium oxide scale, which reduces oxygen diffusion into the material. Other gases, such as sulfur dioxide, hydrogen sulfide, carbon monoxide, chlorine, also attack stainless steel. Resistance to other gases is dependent on the type of gas, the temperature, and the alloying content of the stainless steel. With the addition of up to 5% aluminium, ferritic grades Fr-Cr-Al are designed for electrical resistance and oxidation resistance at elevated temperatures. Such alloys include Kanthal, produced in the form of wire or ribbons.

Standard finishes

Standard mill finishes can be applied to flat rolled stainless steel directly by the rollers and by mechanical abrasives. Steel is first rolled to size and thickness and then annealed to change the properties of the final material. Any oxidation that forms on the surface (mill scale) is removed by pickling, and a passivation layer is created on the surface. A final finish can then be applied to achieve the desired aesthetic appearance.

The following designations are used in the U.S. to describe stainless steel finishes by ASTM A480/A480M-18 (DIN):

 No. 0: Hot-rolled, annealed, thicker plates
 No. 1 (1D): Hot-rolled, annealed and passivated
 No. 2D (2D): Cold rolled, annealed, pickled and passivated
 No. 2B (2B): Same as above with additional pass through highly polished rollers
 No. 2BA (2R): Bright annealed (BA or 2R) same as above then bright annealed under oxygen-free atmospheric condition
 No. 3 (G-2G:) Coarse abrasive finish applied mechanically
 No. 4 (1J-2J): Brushed finish
 No. 5: Satin finish
 No. 6 (1K-2K): Matte finish (brushed but smoother than #4)
 No. 7 (1P-2P): Reflective finish
 No. 8: Mirror finish
 No. 9: Bead blast finish
 No. 10: Heat colored finish – offering a wide range of electropolished and heat colored surfaces

Joining 

A wide range of joining processes are available for stainless steels, though welding is by far the most common.

The ease of welding largely depends on the type of stainless steel used. Austenitic stainless steels are the easiest to weld by electric arc, with weld properties similar to those of the base metal (not cold-worked). Martensitic stainless steels can also be welded by electric-arc but, as the heat-affected zone (HAZ) and the fusion zone (FZ) form martensite upon cooling, precautions must be taken to avoid cracking of the weld. Improper welding practices can additionally cause sugaring (oxide scaling) and/or heat tint on the backside of the weld. This can be prevented with the use of back-purging gases, backing plates, and fluxes. Post-weld heat treatment is almost always required while preheating before welding is also necessary in some cases. Electric arc welding of type 430 ferritic stainless steel results in grain growth in the HAZ, which leads to brittleness. This has largely been overcome with stabilized ferritic grades, where niobium, titanium, and zirconium form precipitates that prevent grain growth. Duplex stainless steel welding by electric arc is a common practice but requires careful control of the process parameters. Otherwise, the precipitation of unwanted intermetallic phases occurs, which reduces the toughness of the welds.

Electric arc welding processes include:

Gas metal arc welding, also known as MIG/MAG welding
Gas tungsten arc welding, also known as tungsten inert gas (TIG) welding
Plasma arc welding
Flux-cored arc welding
Shielded metal arc welding (covered electrode)
Submerged arc welding

MIG, MAG and TIG welding are the most common methods.

Other welding processes include:

Stud welding
Resistance spot welding
Resistance seam welding
Flash welding
Laser beam welding
Oxy-acetylene welding

Stainless steel may be bonded with adhesives such as silicone, silyl modified polymers, and epoxies. Acrylic and polyurethane adhesives are also used in some situations.

Production 

Most of the world's stainless steel production is produced by the following processes:

 Electric arc furnace (EAF): stainless steel scrap, other ferrous scrap, and ferrous alloys (Fe Cr, Fe Ni, Fe Mo, Fe Si) are melted together. The molten metal is then poured into a ladle and transferred into the AOD process (see below).
 Argon oxygen decarburization (AOD): carbon in the molten steel is removed (by turning it into carbon monoxide gas) and other compositional adjustments are made to achieve the desired chemical composition.
 Hot rolling (HR): slabs and blooms are reheated in a furnace and hot-rolled. Hot rolling reduces the thickness of the slabs to produce about -thick coils. Blooms, on the other hand, are hot-rolled into bars, which are cut into lengths at the exit of the rolling mill, or wire rod, which is coiled.
 Cold finishing (CF) depends on the type of product being finished:
Hot-rolled coils are pickled in acid solutions to remove the oxide scale on the surface, then subsequently cold rolled in Sendzimir rolling mills and annealed in a protective atmosphere until the desired thickness and surface finish is obtained. Further operations such as slitting and tube forming can be performed in downstream facilities.
Hot-rolled bars are straightened, then machined to the required tolerance and finish.
Wire rod coils are subsequently processed to produce cold-finished bars on drawing benches, fasteners on boltmaking machines, and wire on single or multipass drawing machines.

World stainless steel production figures are published yearly by the International Stainless Steel Forum. Of the EU production figures, Italy, Belgium and Spain were notable, while Canada and Mexico produced none. China, Japan, South Korea, Taiwan, India the US and Indonesia were large producers while Russia reported little production.

Breakdown of production by stainless steels families in 2017:

 Austenitic stainless steels Cr-Ni (also called 300-series, see "Grades" section above): 54%
 Austenitic stainless steels Cr-Mn (also called 200-series): 21%
 Ferritic and martensitic stainless steels (also called 400-series): 23%

Applications 

Stainless steel is used in a multitude of fields including architecture, art, chemical engineering, food and beverage manufacture, vehicles, medicine, energy and firearms.

Life cycle cost

Life cycle cost (LCC) calculations are used to select the design and the materials that will lead to the lowest cost over the whole life of a project, such as a building or a bridge.

The formula, in a simple form, is the following:

 

where LCC is the overall life cycle cost, AC is the acquisition cost, IC the installation cost, OC the operating and maintenance costs, LP the cost of lost production due to downtime, and RC the replacement materials cost.

In addition, N is the planned life of the project, i the interest rate, and n the year in which a particular OC or LP or RC is taking place. The interest rate (i) is used to convert expenses from different years to their present value (a method widely used by banks and insurance companies) so they can be added and compared fairly. The usage of the sum formula captures the fact that expenses over the lifetime of a project must be cumulated after they are corrected for interest rate.

Application of LCC in materials selection

Stainless steel used in projects often results in lower LCC values compared to other materials. The higher acquisition cost (AC) of stainless steel components are often offset by improvements in operating and maintenance costs, reduced loss of production (LP) costs, and the higher resale value of stainless steel components.

LCC calculations are usually limited to the project itself. However, there may be other costs that a project stakeholder may wish to consider:
 Utilities, such as power plants, water supply & wastewater treatment, and hospitals, cannot be shut down. Any maintenance will require extra costs associated with continuing service.
 Indirect societal costs (with possible political fallout) may be incurred in some situations such as closing or reducing traffic on bridges, creating queues, delays, loss of working hours to the people, and increased pollution by idling vehicles.

Sustainability–recycling and reuse 

The average carbon footprint of stainless steel (all grades, all countries) is estimated to be 2.90 kg of CO2 per kg of stainless steel produced, of which 1.92 kg are emissions from raw materials (Cr, Ni, Mo); 0.54 kg from electricity and steam, and 0.44 kg are direct emissions (i.e., by the stainless steel plant). Note that stainless steel produced in countries that use cleaner sources of electricity (such as France, which uses nuclear energy) will have a lower carbon footprint. Ferritics without Ni will have a lower CO2 footprint than austenitics with 8% Ni or more. Carbon footprint must not be the only sustainability-related factor for deciding the choice of materials:

 Over any product life, maintenance, repairs or early end of life (planned obsolescence) can increase its overall footprint far beyond initial material differences. In addition, loss of service (typically for bridges) may induce large hidden costs, such as queues, wasted fuel, and loss of man-hours.
 How much material is used to provide a given service varies with the performance, particularly the strength level, which allows lighter structures and components.

Stainless steel is 100% recyclable. An average stainless steel object is composed of about 60% recycled material of which approximately 40% originates from end-of-life products, while the remaining 60% comes from manufacturing processes. What prevents a higher recycling content is the availability of stainless steel scrap, in spite of a very high recycling rate. There is a secondary market that recycles usable scrap for many stainless steel markets. The product is mostly coil, sheet, and blanks. This material is purchased at a less-than-prime price and sold to commercial quality stampers and sheet metal houses. The material may have scratches, pits, and dents but is made to the current specifications.

The stainless steel cycle starts with carbon steel scrap, primary metals, and slag. The next step is the production of hot-rolled and cold-finished steel products in steel mills. Some scrap is produced, which is directly reused in the melting shop. The manufacturing of components is the third step. Some scrap is produced and enters the recycling loop. Assembly of final goods and their use does not generate any material loss. The fourth step is the collection of stainless steel for recycling at the end of life of the goods (such as kitchenware, pulp and paper plants, or automotive parts). This is where it is most difficult to get stainless steel to enter the recycling loop, as shown in the table below:

Nanoscale stainless steel 

Stainless steel nanoparticles have been produced in the laboratory. These may have applications as additives for high-performance applications. For example, sulfurization, phosphorization, and nitridation treatments to produce nanoscale stainless steel based catalysts could enhance the electrocatalytic performance of stainless steel for water splitting.

Health effects 

There is extensive research indicating some probable increased risk of cancer (particularly lung cancer) from inhaling fumes while welding stainless steel. Stainless steel welding is suspected of producing carcinogenic fumes from cadmium oxides, nickel, and chromium. According to Cancer Council Australia, "In 2017, all types of welding fumes were classified as a Group 1 carcinogen."

Stainless steel is generally considered to be biologically inert. However, during cooking, small amounts of nickel and chromium leach out of new stainless steel cookware into highly acidic food. Nickel can contribute to cancer risks—particularly lung cancer and nasal cancer. However, no connection between stainless steel cookware and cancer has been established.

See also 
 AL-6XN
 Cobalt-chrome
 Corrosion engineering
 Corrugated stainless steel tubing
 List of blade materials
 List of steel producers
 Metallic fiber
 Pilling–Bedworth ratio
 Rouging
 SAF 2205
 Stainless steel soap

Notes

References

Further reading 
 
 International Standard ISO15510:2014

External links 

 
 

 
1916 introductions
Biomaterials
Building materials
Chromium alloys
English inventions
Roofing materials